George Field or Fields may refer to:

People 
 George Field (chemist) (1777–1854), English chemist
 George Field (actor) (1877–1925), American silent film actor
 George Field (Kent cricketer) (1834–1901), English cricketer
 George Field (Oxford University cricketer) (1871–1942), English cricketer
 George Fields (baseball) (1852–1933), American professional baseball player
 George B. Field (born 1929), American astrophysicist
 George Wilton Field (1863–1938), American biologist
 George Fields (American football) (born 1935/36), American football player
 George Washington Fields, first Black graduate of Cornell Law School

Transportation 
 George Field, Illinois, a World War II United States Army Air Forces training base